The Mabuhay Channel was a Filipino language channel that broadcasts to Filipinos abroad. It was created exclusively for Filipinos living in the United States by Philippine Multimedia Systems, Inc. (PMSI), the only DTH satellite broadcaster in the Philippines, operator of now-defunct Dream Satellite TV and by-then sister company of the Associated Broadcasting Company.

The Mabuhay Channel featured a wide array of programming from movies, music, sports, entertainment, current affairs to children's and lifestyle programming. The network was a unique partnership of eight different Filipino broadcasters, bring together, ABC Channel 5, NBN Channel 4, RPN Channel 9, IBC Channel 13, CCI Asia Group (ISLA, Juice Channel and Living Asia Channel), Net 25, Viva Entertainment and Regal Entertainment.

The Mabuhay Channel was available on digital cable in Canada and Dream Satellite TV in the Philippines. It was previously available in the US via the Dish Network but was no longer offered. As a result of this, the channel ceased broadcasting on August 18, 2008.

Mabuhay Channel Final Program Line-Up
 A Taste of Life
 Aawitan Kita
 ABC Life
 NewsWatch Aksyon Balita (2006–2008)
 Ali (2005–2007)
 AM @ IBC (2003–2007)
 America Atbp. (2006–2008)
 AMTV
 Arangkada Balita (2000-2006)
 Art Is Kool
 Asenso Pinoy (2005–2008)
 Ang Say ng Kabataan (A.S.K.)
 A.S.T.I.G. (All Set To Imitate God)
 Auto Review
 Baby's World
 Balikatan
 Balitang Balita (2003–2004)
 Bantay OCW with Susan K.: Ang Boses ng OFW (2005–2008)
 Big News (1992-2008)
 Biyaheng Langit
 Biz Show Na 'To!
 Blind Item (2008)
 Bodies and Motion
 Buhay Pinoy
 Business @ 10
 Cerge for Truth
 Chef's On The Go!
 Chikiting Patrol
 Chowtime Na!
 Cinemalaya
 CinePinoy
 Comedy Bites (2005–2007)
 Concert at the Park
 Convergence
 Corporate Billiards League
 Dalawang Tisoy
 Dee's Day (2003–2007)
 Dial M
 Diretsahan
 Diwa ng Katotohanan
 Dokyu
 Double W
 Eezy Dancing
 Entrepinoy
 Equilibrium
 Eskwela Ng Bayan
 Family Rosary Crusade
 Fearless Fighting
 For M
 Field Trip
 Fistorama
 Friends Again
 Frontlines
 Generation RX
 Go Negosyo
 Go Negosyo Big Time
 Good Take!
 Gourmet Everyday (2003–2007)
 Guni-Guni
 Halo-Halo Spesyal USA
 HanapBuhay Overseas
 Healthline (2004–2007)
 Hello Angel
 How 'bout My Place
 I-Balita
 IBC Express Balita (1998-2011)
 IBC News Tonight (2003–2008)
 Ikaw at ang Batas
 IKON Philippines
 INQ TV
 In This Corner
 Insight Inside
 ISLA Strip
 Dayaw
 Ekolohiya
 Entrepreneur
 Hometown
 ISLA Specials 
 ISLA Sports
 Islamusik
 Jescom Documentaries
 Komunidad
 Kultura
 Medika
 NCCA
 People Power Series
 PCIJ
 Pangarap
 Rehiyon
 Super Ferry: Ports of Call
 Teknika
 Island Flavors
 Ispup (2003–2004)
 Isumbong Mo Kay Tulfo
 i-Watch News
 Iyo Ang Katarungan
 Juice Channel Strip
Side Stitch
Slice of Life
Space
 K Na Tayo!
 Kagat ng Dilim
 Kalusugan TV
 Kamao
 Kapatid with Joel Mendez
 Kapihan ng Bayan
 Kasangga Mo ang Langit
 Ke-Mis: Kay Misis Umaasa
 Kerygma TV
 Kids TV
 KNN: Kabataan News Network
 Kol TV
 Krusada Kontra Korupsyon
 Krusada Kontra Krimen (2005–2007)
 Krusada Kontra Kurakot
 Kusina Atbp.
 Lakbayin ang Magandang Pilipinas (2003–2008)
 Last Fool Show
 Light Talk
 Linya
 Living Asia Channel Strip
 Adventure
 Animals Asia
 Antique Asia
 Art Asia
 Asian Specials
 Celebration
 Citizen
 Cuisine Asia
 Flipside
 Gone For the Weekend
 Japan Video Topics
 Kikay Machine
 On-Foot
 Origins
 Our Asia
 Paradise East
 Trade Asia
 Travel Guide 
 Love Bytes
 Mabuhay Movies
 Mabuhay Specials
 Mag-Negosyo Tayo
 Makabayang Duktor
 Make-Over
 May Business Ako
 May Puso ang Batas
 Metro
 Moments
 Moments with Fr. Jerry Orbos
 Mommy Academy
 Mommy Elvie's Problematic Show
 Moonrise Film Festival
 Mother Studio Presents
 Music Bureau
 National Pool Championships
 Negosyo Atbp.
 Net 25 World Report
 Network Forum
 New Life Series
 NewsWatch
 Jr. NewsWatch
 NewsWatch Now
 One Morning Cafe
 Oras ng Himala
 Paco Park Presents
 Para Po
 Parenting 101
 Pilipinas, Ngayon Na!
 Pinoy Box Office
 Pinoy Music Box (PMB)
 Pinoy Sports Idol
 Pinoy Street USA
 Prangkahan
 Proactiv
 Problema Nyo, Sagot Ko!
 Quantum Showcase
 Que Horror
 Real Stories Kasama si Loren (2004–2007)
 Regal Shocker
 Retro TV (2003–2004)
 Ricky Reyes Beauty Plus
 Ringside TV
 RJ America
 Sabado Boys
 Secrets with Juliana Palermo
 Sentro (2004–2008)
 Serbis on the Go
 Serbisyo Muna
 Shall We Dance? (2005–2008)
 She...Ka!!! (2007–2008)
 Shootfest
 Shoot That Babe
 Showbiz Ka!
 Sing Galing! (2003–2005)
 SINGLE
 Slingo
 Smash TV
 Soccer Showdown
 S.O.S.: Stories of Survival
 Soul Mix
 Spoon
 Star sa Kusina
 Sunday Greats
 Sunday TV Mass
 Taas Noo Pilipino
 Tahanang Pinoy
 Talk Ko `To
 Talk Toons
 Tara Let's
 Teens
 Teka Mona! (2006–2007)
 Teledyaryo (2005–2008)
 Teledyaryo Ala Una
 Teledyaryo Alas-Dose
 Teledyaryo Alas-Nuwebe
 Teledyaryo Alas Tres
 Teledyaryo Business
 Teledyaryo Final Edition
 Teledyaryo Panlalawigan
 Teledyaryo Sports
 Teledyaryo sa Hapon
 Teledyaryo Weekend
 Tribe
 That's My Job
 The Exchange
 The Final Cut
 The Morning Show (2005–2007)
 The Misadventures of Maverick and Ariel
 The Police Hour
 The Practical Cook
 The Probe Team Documentaries
 The Working President (2003–2008)
 Three Blind Dates
 Tinig ng Bayan
 Tipitipitim Tipitom
 Tipong Pinoy
 Tondominium
 Totoo TV (2005–2007)
 Trabaho Lang!
 Travel and Trade
 Tropang Trumpo (1992-1998)
 TV Shopping
 Ugnayang Pambansa
 Urban Doktor
 VIVA Boxing
 Wala Yan Sa Lolo Ko
 Waway
 Welcome Home
 Win Win Win
 Word for the World
 Word Made Flesh
 WOW (What's On Weekend) (2007–2008)
 Wow Mali Rewind
 Wow Mali Bytes
 Wow Mali Express (2007–2008)
 Wow Maling Mali
 Yan Ang Pinoy
 Yes to Kids
 Youth Alive
 Youth Voice

References

Filipino-American culture
Filipino-Canadian culture
Television networks in the Philippines
Television networks in the United States
Television channels and stations established in 2003
Television channels and stations established in 2008
Joint ventures